Events in the year 1799 in Norway.

Incumbents
Monarch: Christian VII

Events
  The coffee manufacturer Friele is established in Bergen.

Arts and literature

Births
28 October - Ole Gabriel Gabrielsen Ueland, politician (d.1870)
14 November - Ole Edvard Buck, politician (d.1843)

Full date unknown
Jens Henrik Beer, politician
Peter Bøyesen, businessperson and politician (d.1867)
Borger Christophersen Hoen, politician
Peder Rasmus Lyng, politician
Ole Christensen Walstad, politician

Deaths

See also